The formal fallacy of affirming a disjunct also known as the fallacy of the alternative disjunct or a false exclusionary disjunct occurs when a deductive argument takes the following logical form:

A or B
A 
Therefore, not B

Or in logical operators:

 ¬  

Where  denotes a logical assertion.

Explanation

The fallacy lies in concluding that one disjunct must be false because the other disjunct is true; in fact they may both be true because "or" is defined inclusively rather than exclusively. It is a fallacy of equivocation between the operations OR and XOR.

Affirming the disjunct should not be confused with the valid argument known as the disjunctive syllogism.

Examples

The following argument indicates the unsoundness of affirming a disjunct:

Max is a mammal or Max is a cat.
Max is a mammal.
Therefore, Max is not a cat.

This inference is unsound because all cats, by definition, are mammals.

A second example provides a first proposition that appears realistic and shows how an obviously flawed conclusion still arises under this fallacy.

To be on the cover of Vogue Magazine, one must be a celebrity or very beautiful.
This month's cover was a celebrity.
Therefore, this celebrity is not very beautiful.

See also
 Exclusive disjunction
 Logical disjunction
 Syllogistic fallacy

External links

 Fallacy files: affirming a disjunct
Affirming a disjunct – logicallyfallacious.com

Propositional fallacies
Syllogistic fallacies
Logic articles needing expert attention

References